Scum Lake is a lake on the Sibley Peninsula in geographic Sibley Township in the Unorganized Part of Thunder Bay District in Northwestern Ontario, Canada. It is part of the Great Lakes Basin and is located entirely in Sleeping Giant Provincial Park.

The primary outflow is an unnamed creek at the north east that flows to Mary Louise Lake, which in turn flows via Sibley Creek to Lake Superior.

References

Other map sources:

Lakes of Thunder Bay District